Newent Community School  is a secondary school in Newent, Gloucestershire, England. It is an Academy of 1,340 students, serving the town and the rural community. The school provides secondary education for ages 11 to 18. The school offers GCSEs as well as A Levels. In 2001, the school was granted Arts College specialist status. In 2007 the school was also granted Science College as a second specialism. In addition, the school has been awarded Sportsmark Silver, Artsmark Gold and Healthy School. The school became an academy in 2012.

As a community school, adult education classes, are held both in the school and in the dedicated community rooms.

Mark Harper MP was governor between 2000 - 2005.

History
Newent Community School and Sixth Form Centre was Gloucestershire’s first purpose-built comprehensive school. The present building was opened in April 1965, although previously it had operated on a split site in Ross Road.

Originally there were four houses; Collingwood(blue), Mountbatten(red), Nelson (green)and Drake (yellow), but due to a low student numbers Drake was removed and only three remain.

Eco-Lab
The school required a new laboratory to meet curriculum requirements and inspired by exchange visits with a school in Kenya the pupils requested that it be developed as an eco lab. The building incorporates a comprehensive range of sustainable qualities; designed for low energy use with a high performance thermal envelope locally sourced and using renewable, low maintenance materials; good levels of north daylighting linked to automatically controlled artificial lighting and underfloor heating. Energy consumption results are published in the school news network.

Kenya student exchange
Newent Community School, along with two other Gloucestershire schools (Dene Magna School and Lakers School) has been involved with student exchange with St George’s Secondary School near Kisumu in Kenya for twelve years. The school maintains a strong partnership with St George's Secondary School and provides financial and educational support through the use of fundraising.

Students visited St George's in Kenya in 2004, 2006, 2009, 2011, 2013, 2015 and 2017.

Notable former pupils
Alex Cuthbert,  Welsh rugby union player
Vicky Holland, British Triathlete, Commonwealth Games Gold medallist
Ed Leigh, TV Presenter
Stuart Fleetwood Football Player
Andi Gladwin, magician
Joe Edwards (footballer, born 1990) Football Player
 Karen Holford, Chief Executive and Vice-Chancellor of Cranfield University, former Deputy Vice-Chancellor of Cardiff University.

References

External links
 

Secondary schools in Gloucestershire
Academies in Gloucestershire
Newent
Specialist arts colleges in England